Wang Xinting (23 December 1908 – 11 December 1984) was a general in the People's Liberation Army of the People's Republic of China from Hubei.

Biography

Early life 
Wang was born into a humble peasant family in Xiaogan, Hubei Province. In the spring of 1926, he joined the workers' and peasants' movement. He joined the Chinese Workers' and Peasants' Red Army in 1930 and was appointed as a team leader. Following in September, he joined the Communist Party of China. In 1931, he was appointed Party Committee secretary of the 10th Division in the Red Fourth Army. Later in the year, he was appointed as the  deputy secretary general of the army's political department. 
In October 1932, following the Encirclement Campaigns Wang Xinting and Red Fourth Army evacuated Hubei and Henan in favor of Northern Sichuan. In July, he was appointed as the political director of the Red Ninth Army. Wang Xinting participated in the "anti-three-way siege" operations and "anti-six-way siege" operations. Wang Xinting joined the Long March in May 1935 and was later promoted to Chief Minister of the General Political Department of the Red Fourth Army. With the army's arrival in northern Shaanbei in 1936, Wang was concurrently appointed as the Political Director of the Red Thirty-First Army.

During the Second Sino-Japanese War 
Following the outbreak of war, Wang was appointed as the Political Director in  the 129th Division of the Eighth Route Army, assisting in the expansion of the army in the Shanxi – Changzhi region.  In January 1938, he was appointed as the political commissar of the 386th Brigade and worked alongside Chen Geng. On 22 February 1938, the brigade ambushed and killed more than 130 Japanese troops. The 386th Brigade was notoriously known for their guerilla warfare, and with other surrounding brigades inflicted over 4000 casualties to the Imperial Japanese Army. The Japanese hunt for the brigade extended to pasting slogans on such as "focus your attack on the 386th Brigade" on their tanks.

References 

Chinese Communist Party politicians from Hubei
1908 births
1984 deaths
Chinese revolutionaries
People of the Chinese Civil War
People's Republic of China politicians from Hubei
Politicians from Xiaogan
People's Liberation Army generals from Hubei